Titus Omotara is a Nigerian table tennis player. He competed in the men's doubles event at the 1988 Summer Olympics.

References

Year of birth missing (living people)
Living people
Nigerian male table tennis players
Olympic table tennis players of Nigeria
Table tennis players at the 1988 Summer Olympics
Place of birth missing (living people)